SAE 316L grade stainless steel, sometimes referred to as A4 stainless steel or marine grade stainless steel, is the second most common austenitic stainless steel after 304/A2 stainless steel. Its primary alloying constituents after iron, are chromium (between 16–18%), nickel (10–12%) and molybdenum (2–3%), with small (<1%) quantities of silicon, phosphorus & sulfur also present. The addition of molybdenum provides greater corrosion resistance than 304, with respect to localized corrosive attack by chlorides and to general corrosion by reducing acids, such as sulfuric acid. 316L grade is the low carbon version of 316 stainless steel. When cold worked, 316 can produce high yield and tensile strengths similar to Duplex stainless grades.

It is commonly used in chemical and petrochemical industry, in food processing, pharmaceutical equipment, medical devices, in potable water, wastewater treatment, in marine applications and architectural applications near the seashore or in urban areas.

Gallery

See also
SAF 2205

References

Stainless steel